Corynabutilon vitifolium (syn. Abutilon vitifolium)
is a species of plant in the mallow family. Its native range is central and south-central Chile. Its cultivars 'Tennant's White' and 'Veronica Tennant' have gained the Royal Horticultural Society's Award of Garden Merit.

References

Malveae
Plants described in 1949
Taxa named by Antonio José Cavanilles